The Darling can refer to

Places
The Darling River, third longest river in Australia
The Darling Scarp, a low escarpment east of the Swan Coastal Plain and Perth, Western Australia

Arts
The Darling of Paris a 1917 silent film starring Theda Bara
The Darling Buds an indie band from Newport, South Wales
The Darling DeMaes, Canadian indie rock band based in Montreal, Quebec
The Darling Buds of May, British comedy drama
The Darlings, a fictional family of musicians on sitcom The Andy Griffith Show
The Darling (Chekhov), 1899 short story by Anton Chekhov
The Darling (novel), 2005 novel by Russell Banks

See also
Darling (disambiguation)